CFM or cfm may refer to:

Organizations
 Canadian Federation of Musicians, the Canadian branch of the American Federation of Musicians
 Capital Fund Management, a French hedge fund
 CFM International, a joint venture American and French companies to build a series of jet engines
 CFM (radio station), a radio station broadcasting to parts of Cumbria and Scotland
 Christian Family Movement, a national movement of small faith groups aimed at promoting Christ-centered marriage and family life
 Christian Federation of Malaysia, an ecumenical body in Malaysia comprising all types of Christian churches
 Christian Fellowship Ministries, a church associated with Potter's House Christian Fellowship
 Compagnie française des métaux, a former non-ferrous metal manufacturer
 Convenient Food Mart, a chain of convenience stores in the US
 Cook Flying Machines, designer and maker of the CFM Shadow microlight aeroplane
 Crypton Future Media, a Japanese company

Railways
 Calea Ferată din Moldova, the Moldovan State Railway
 Caminhos de Ferro de Moçambique, the railway company of Mozambique
 Moçâmedes Railway or Caminho-de-Ferro de Moçâmedes, an Angolan railway company

Science and technology
 Cerebral function monitoring, a technique for monitoring electrical activity in the brain over time
 Code Fragment Manager, the native runtime environment for classic Mac OS, which executes Preferred Executable Format files; see Manager (Mac OS)
 ColdFusion Markup Language (filename suffix)
 Confocal microscopy, an optical imaging technique
 Connectivity Fault Management, protocols that help administrators debug Ethernet networks in the IEEE 802.1ag standard
 Cubic feet per minute, a measurement unit of volume or mass flow
 Carbon Footprint Management, A digital platform dedicated to optimizing carbon emissions

Other uses
 Cadet Forces Medal, a medal to reward adult volunteers of cadet forces in the UK and New Zealand

 Certified Financial Manager, Institute of Management Accountants
 Certified Floodplain Manager, a civil engineering certification in the List of professional designations in the United States
 Chief federal magistrate, in the Federal Circuit Court of Australia
 Club de Foot Montréal, an association football team in Montreal, Quebec, Canada

 CFM, an EDM radio station broadcasting to Constanta, Romania